The 1938 Sacramento Solons season saw the Sacramento Solons baseball team win the Pacific Coast League (PCL) pennant. Led by manager Bill Killefer, the Solons finished third in the PCL with a 95–82 record, but qualified for the PCL's four-team playoffs. They defeated the first-place Los Angeles Angels, four games to one, in the opening round, and then defeated the fourth-place San Francisco Seals in the championship series, again by four games to one, to win the PCL's President's Trophy. However, the PCL's rules were changed in 1938 such that the pennant was awarded in 1938 to Angels as the team with the best record in the regular season.

Left-hander Tony Freitas was the team's leading pitcher, compiling a 24–11 record and 2.67 earned run average (ERA) in 290 inning pitched. Cotton Pippen also pitched well, compiling a 17–8 record with a 3.15 ERA in 223 inning pitched.

The Solons had a team batting of .250, the lowest among all nine PCL teams, and 42 points lower than the San Francisco Seals' .292 team batting average. Further, no Sacramento batter ranked among the league's top 25 in batting average.

1938 PCL standings

Statistics

Batting 
Note: Pos = Position; G = Games played; AB = At bats; H = Hits; Avg. = Batting average; HR = Home runs; SLG = Slugging percentage; RBI = Runs batted in; SB = Stolen bases

Pitching 
Note: G = Games pitched; IP = Innings pitched; W = Wins; L = Losses; PCT = Win percentage; ERA = Earned run average; SO = Strikeouts

References

Further reading
 "The Greatest Minor League: A History of the Pacific Coast League, 1903-1957", by Dennis Snelling (McFarland 2011)

Sacramento Solons season
Pacific Coast League seasons